The 1919 Croydon South by-election was a parliamentary by-election for the British House of Commons constituency of Croydon South on 14 November 1919.

Vacancy
The by-election was caused by the resignation of the sitting Unionist MP, Sir Ian Malcolm on 28 October 1919. He had been the MP for Croydon since December 1910.

Electoral history
Croydon was a traditionally strong area for the Unionists. The Croydon constituency was created in 1885 and won by the Unionists at every election. In 1918, it was divided into two seats, and its MP, Ian Malcolm, was elected for the new Croydon South seat. He was helped by the absence of a Liberal opponent and the official support of the Coalition government;

Candidates
The Unionists selected 49-year-old Sir Allan Smith to defend the seat. He was a solicitor and Chairman of the Management Board of the Engineering and Allied Employers’ National Federation.
On 30 October, the Croydon Liberal and Radical Association unanimously adopted 60-year-old Alderman Howard Houlder to challenge for the seat. He had not stood for parliament before but been elected to Croydon Council. He served as Mayor of Croydon from 1916 to 1919. He worked for the family shipping business.
The Labour Party did not run a candidate this time.

Campaign
Polling Day was set for 14 November, just 17 days after the resignation of Malcolm. Close of Nominations occurred on 4 November to reveal a two cornered contest. Smith received official backing from the Coalition Government, while Houlder's candidacy was backed by the Liberal opposition.

Result
There was a big drop in the Unionist majority.

Sir Allan Smith thought the result "was a victory for the forces of unity".

Aftermath
Smith retained the seat at the following election because the anti-Unionist vote was split when Muggeridge intervened. Houlder did not stand for parliament again.
The result at the following General election;

References

See also
 List of United Kingdom by-elections
 United Kingdom by-election records
 

Croydon South by-election
Croydon South,1919
Croydon South,1919
Croydon South by-election
Croydon South,1919
20th century in Surrey
Croydon South by-election